The Battle of Gloucester Point, Virginia was the first reported exchange of fire in the American Civil War, following the surrender of Fort Sumter. As Lincoln extended the Union blockade to include Virginia, the rebels (notionally Confederates) tried to deny Union access to the local estuaries. On May 7, 1861, Lieutenant Thomas O. Selfridge, Jr. commanding the USS Yankee was ordered to reconnoitre the new fortifications at Gloucester Point opposite Yorktown. Shots were exchanged, causing no casualties, Selfridge claiming that his guns were too small to damage the battery, commanded by Lieutenant John Thompson Brown, credited with firing the first cannon shot of the war in Virginia.

Background
On April 15, 1861, the day after the U.S. Army garrison surrendered Fort Sumter to Confederate forces, President Abraham Lincoln called for 75,000 volunteers to suppress the rebellion of the seven Deep South Slave states that had formed the Confederate States of America and to reclaim the federal property that had been seized by the Confederacy. Four Upper South States that permitted slavery, including Virginia, refused to furnish troops for this purpose and immediately began the process of secession from the Union to join the Confederacy. 

On April 17, 1861, the delegates previously elected to the Virginia Secession Convention in Richmond, Virginia passed an ordinance of secession from the Union. The ordinance was subject to a ratification vote of the people of the state to be held on May 23, 1861, but the actions of the convention and Virginia's Governor John Letcher effectively took Virginia out of the Union before the vote could be taken, as the convention authorized the governor to call for volunteers to join the military forces of Virginia to defend the state against Federal military action.

On April 22, 1861, Governor Letcher appointed Robert E. Lee as commander in chief of Virginia’s army and navy forces. On April 24, 1861, Virginia and the Confederate States agreed that the Virginian forces would be under the overall direction of the Confederate President, pending completion of the process of Virginia joining the Confederate States. As these developments showed that Virginia would complete the process of secession, president Lincoln did not wait for the people's vote before he took action against Virginia that treated it as part of the Confederacy. On April 27, 1861, Lincoln extended the blockade of the seven original Confederate States which he had declared on April 19, 1861 to include the ports of Virginia and North Carolina.

On May 3, 1861, Major General Robert E. Lee of the Virginia forces appointed Colonel William B. Taliaferro commander of defenses at Gloucester Point, Virginia on the York River opposite Yorktown, Virginia. General Lee instructed the colonel to cooperate with Virginia Navy Captain William C. Whittle in the construction and defense of a shore battery to cover the York River at that location. On May 6, 1861, Taliaferro ordered a company of fifty men of the Richmond Howitzers, a Virginia volunteer artillery regiment, with two six-pounder cannons, to report to Gloucester Point to assist in the defense and operation of the shore battery. The artillerymen arrived at Gloucester Point early on May 7, 1861. This force had not yet been formally transferred to the Confederate States Army or Confederate States Navy, but the Virginians were acting in concert with the Confederacy and in its defense.

Battle
In early May 1861, the Union Navy already had learned that rebel Virginia forces were constructing fortifications at Gloucester Point, Virginia on the York River. On May 7, 1861, Union Flag Officer Garrett J. Pendergrast ordered Navy Lieutenant Thomas O. Selfridge, Jr. to examine the reported fortifications. On the same day, Lieutenant Selfridge, in command of the USS Yankee, a converted steam tugboat of 328 tons displacement with 2 guns, sailed the Yankee up the York River in a reconnaissance with the purpose of developing intelligence on the fortifications at Gloucester Point. As the Yankee approached to within about 2,000 yards of the shore battery, the battery fired a shot across the boat's bow. The Yankee slowly continued on its course. The battery then fired another shot at the boat.

Lieutenant Selfridge reported that the shore battery fired 12 shots at the Yankee, but in a later account, T. Roberts Baker of the Richmond Howitzers stated that the Virginia force had fired 13 shots. Lt. Selfridge reported that all but 2 of the battery’s shots were short. The Yankee fired 4 shots and 2 shells at the battery in return. Selfridge stated that he could not hit the opposing force's guns because of their elevation and because his guns were too small to damage the battery and fortifications in any event. The Yankee's guns were "light 32s". Selfridge opined that the Rebels had 2 "long 32s" and an "8-inch shell". He thought the rebels had a force of about 40 men. In fact, the battery only had smaller "six-pounder" guns on this date.

After this exchange of cannon fire, the Yankee turned around and headed for its base at Hampton Roads near Fort Monroe. Selfridge did not mention damage to the Yankee in his report. T. Roberts Baker of the Virginia force recalled that two shots from the battery hit the Yankee. Neither side reported any of their men as killed or wounded.

Despite Baker’s later account that Colonel Taliaferro directed the actions of the Richmond Howitzers at Gloucester Point on May 7, Colonel Taliaferro stated in a report on May 8, 1861, that he arrived at Gloucester Point after the engagement had taken place. He said that Captain Whittle had directed the firing at the Yankee. Whittle denied this. Lieutenant John Thompson Brown of the Richmond Howitzers was in immediate command of the small force of artillerymen who manned the battery at this time. Some sources credit him with firing the first cannon shot of the Civil War in Virginia. Brown was promoted to captain on May 9, 1861.

Aftermath
By May 11, 1861, the Virginians had placed two nine-inch (229 mm) guns at the battery at Gloucester Point and had two more ready for placement there. By June 25, 1861, the Confederates had fourteen heavy guns in place at the battery. The men of the Richmond Howitzers were relieved and moved from Gloucester Point to Yorktown on May 26, 1861. The Richmond Howitzers participated in the Battle of Big Bethel, Virginia on June 10, 1861.

Similar minor engagements between Union gunboats and Virginia shore batteries occurred soon after the action at Gloucester Point at the Battle of Sewell's Point, the Battle of Aquia Creek and the Battle of Pig Point. The Battle of Gloucester Point can be considered with those subsequent actions as part of the Union campaign to blockade the Chesapeake Bay and the entire coast of the Southern States.

The Confederates abandoned the naval batteries at Gloucester Point and Yorktown overnight on May 3–4, 1862. They took this action during the Confederate retreat up the Peninsula toward Richmond during the Peninsula Campaign.

Captain John Thompson Brown ultimately became a colonel. He was commander of the artillery for the 2d Corps of the Army of Northern Virginia at the Battle of Gettysburg. Brown was in charge of a division of three battalions of artillery at the Battle of the Wilderness when he was killed in action on May 6, 1864.

Notes

References
 Fredriksen, John C. Civil War Almanac. New York: Facts on File, 2007. .
 Gordon, E. Clifford. The Battle of Big Bethel. Richmond, VA: Carlton McCarthy and Co., 1883. Contributions to a History of the Richmond Howitzer Battalion, Pamphlet No. 1. Richmond, VA: Carlton McCarthy and Co., 1883. Contributions to a History of the Richmond Howitzer Battalion, Pamphlet No. 3. Diary of T. Roberts Baker, of the Second Howitzer Company of Richmond, VA. Richmond, VA: Carlton McCarthy and Co., 1884. Contributions to a History of the Richmond Howitzer Battalion, Pamphlet No. 4. Richmond, VA: Carlton McCarthy and Co., 1886. Extracts from an old order book, First Howitzers of Richmond, VA. .
 Hannings, Bud. Every Day of the Civil War: A Chronological Encyclopedia p. 40. Jefferson, NC: McFarland & Company, Inc., 2010. . Retrieved April 24, 2011.
 Hansen, Harry. The Civil War: A History. New York: Bonanza Books, 1961. .
 Long, E. B. and Barbara Long. The Civil War Day by Day: An Almanac, 1861–1865. Garden City, NY: Doubleday, 1971. .
 Neeser, Robert Wilden. Statistical and Chronological History of the United States Navy, 1775-1907, Volume 2. New York, The Macmillan Company, 1909. . Retrieved April 22, 2011.
 Parker, William Harwar. The Confederate States Navy, Volume XII of ‘’Confederate Military History’’, edited by Clement Anselm Evans, Atlanta: Confederate Publishing Company, 1899, retrieved April 22, 2011.
 Rush, Lt. Commander Richard and Robert H. Woods. Naval War Records Office, United States. Navy Dept. Official records of the Union and Confederate Navies in the War of the Rebellion Report of Lt. Thomas O. Selfridge, Jr. to Flag Officer G. J. Pendergrast, May 7, 1861. Washington, DC.: Government Printing Office, 1896. Series 1, Volume 4. . Retrieved April 22, 2011.
 Salmon, John S. The Official Virginia Civil War Battlefield Guide. Mechanicsburg, PA: Stackpole Books, 2001. .
 Scharf, John Thomas. History of the Confederate States Navy From Its Organization to the Surrender of Its Last Vessel. New York: Rogers & Sherwood, 1887. . Retrieved February 1, 2011.
 Scott, Robert N.; U.S. War Department. The War of the Rebellion: A Compilation of the Official Records of the Union and Confederate Armies. Series 1, Volume 2. Washington: Government Printing Office, 1880. . Retrieved April 22, 2011.
 Sifakis, Stewart. Who Was Who in the Civil War.'' New York: Facts On File, 1988. .
 Wyllie, Arthur. The Union Navy. Gardners Books 2007. p. 657. . Retrieved April 24, 2011.

Battles of the Chesapeake Bay Blockade of the American Civil War
Battles of the Eastern Theater of the American Civil War
Gloucester County, Virginia
Inconclusive battles of the American Civil War
Naval battles of the American Civil War
Battles and conflicts without fatalities
Battles of the American Civil War in Virginia
1861 in the American Civil War
1861 in Virginia
Riverine warfare
May 1861 events